Noël De Pauw (25 July 1942 – 13 April 2015) was a Belgian professional racing cyclist. He won the Omloop Het Nieuwsblad in 1965.

References

External links
 
 

1942 births
2015 deaths
Belgian male cyclists
Cyclists from East Flanders
People from Zwalm